Thomas Clarke (17 October 1839 – 8 August 1892) was a Barbadian cricketer. He played in one first-class match for the Barbados cricket team in 1871/72.

See also
 List of Barbadian representative cricketers

References

External links
 

1839 births
1892 deaths
Barbadian cricketers
Barbados cricketers
People from Christ Church, Barbados